Robert Alexander Harvey (May 28, 1918 – June 27, 1992) was an American outfielder in Negro league baseball. He played for the Newark Eagles, Birmingham Black Barons, and Houston Eagles between 1943 and 1950.

References

External links
 and Seamheads
Negro League Baseball Players Association

1918 births
1992 deaths
People from St. Michaels, Maryland
Baseball players from Maryland
African-American baseball players
Birmingham Black Barons players
Elmwood Giants players
Newark Eagles players
20th-century African-American sportspeople